Mbongeni Theo 'Bongi' Mbonambi (born 7 January 1991) is a South African professional rugby union player, He currently plays as a hooker for the URC team  and also the South Africa national rugby team. He made his senior debut during the 2012 Super Rugby season against the Crusaders in Pretoria.

Mbonambi was a member of the South Africa Under 20 team that competed in the 2011 IRB Junior World Championship.

International rugby

On 28 May 2016, Mbonambi was included in a 31-man  squad for their three-test match series against a touring  team.

Mbonambi was named in South Africa's squad for the 2019 Rugby World Cup. South Africa went on to win the tournament, defeating England in the final.

International statistics

Test Match Record

Pld = Games Played, W = Games Won, D = Games Drawn, L = Games Lost, Tri = Tries Scored, Pts = Points Scored

Test tries (9)

References

External links
 
 

1991 births
Living people
People from Bethlehem, Free State
Zulu people
South African rugby union players
Rugby union hookers
Bulls (rugby union) players
Blue Bulls players
South Africa Under-20 international rugby union players
Tshwane University of Technology alumni
South Africa international rugby union players
Stormers players
Western Province (rugby union) players
Sharks (rugby union) players
Sharks (Currie Cup) players
Rugby union players from the Free State (province)